Bake Off Greece (also called Bake Off) is a Greek television baking competition, produced by Love Productions, in which a group of amateur bakers compete against each other in a series of rounds, attempting to impress a group of judges with their baking skills, with a contestant being eliminated in each round, with the winner being selected from the contestants who reach the finals. The show's first episode was aired on 23 September 2018. The Show based on the BBC baking competition The Great British Bake Off.

The programme is presenting by Ioanna Triantafyllidou, with judges Akis Petretzikis, Nikolas Straggas and Dimitris Xronopoulos.

Host and judges
Key

Series overview 

 In series 1 the episodes 19, 21 and 23 were broadcast on Fridays at 21:00pm.

Season 1: 2018 
Series 1 of Bake Off Greece saw eighteen home bakers take part in a bake-off to test their baking skills as they battled to be crowned the Bake Off Greece best amateur baker. It began airing on 23 September 2018 on Alpha TV.

The winner is Venia Flessa.

Bakers

Results summary 

Colour key:

 Baker was one of the judges' least favourite bakers that week, but was not eliminated.
 Baker was one of the judges' favourite bakers that week, but was not the Star Baker.
 Baker got through to the next round.
 Baker was eliminated.
 Baker was the Star Baker.
 Baker was Returned or Arrived
 Baker was a series runner-up.
 Baker was the series winner.

Episodes

Team fase

Episode 1: Premiere

Episode 2: Chocolate

Episode 3: Greek pastry

Episode 4: Tiny episode 
This was the last episode in the team fase

Individual fase

Episode 5: Snacks

Episode 6: Salty and sweet

Episode 7: Français pastry

Episode 8: Desserts

Episode 9: Judge 
In this episode the judge and the presenter was the encharged to decide the challenges
Technical challenge was decided by Nikolas and Akis / Creative challenge was decided by Ioanna and Dimitris

Episode 10: Countries

Episode 11: Semifinal

Episode 12: Final

References

External links 
 

Greek reality television series
2018 Greek television series debuts
2010s Greek television series
Alpha TV original programming
Greek-language television shows
Television shows set in Athens
International versions of The Great British Bake Off
Greek television series based on British television series